Daniel Roth may refer to:

Daniel Roth (organist), French organist, composer, and pedagogue
 Daniel Roth (watchmakers), a watch company
Daniel Roth (writer), editor in chief, LinkedIn

Roth, Daniel